The 2022 Senior Bowl was a college football all-star game played on February 5, 2022, at Hancock Whitney Stadium in Mobile, Alabama. The game featured prospects for the 2022 draft of the professional National Football League (NFL), predominantly from the NCAA Division I Football Bowl Subdivision (FBS). It was one of the final 2021–22 bowl games concluding the 2021 FBS football season. Sponsored by Reese's Peanut Butter Cups, the game was officially known as the Reese's Senior Bowl, with television coverage provided by NFL Network.

This was the first time the Senior Bowl was played in February.

Players

National team
Full roster online . Numerical rosters here (a number may be shared by an offensive and defensive player).

American team
Full roster online . Numerical rosters here (a number may be shared by an offensive and defensive player).

Game summary

References

External links
 Game broadcast via YouTube

Senior Bowl
Senior Bowl
Senior Bowl
Senior Bowl